"Johnny Run Away" is the debut single by Australian singer Tones and I, released on 1 March 2019 as the lead single from Tones and I's debut EP The Kids Are Coming. The song was recorded with Konstantin Kersting and has peaked at number 12 on the ARIA Singles Chart. Upon release, Tones and I said "'Johnny Run Away' is about my best friend coming out to his disapproving father at a young age. The song shows how people are dealing with judgement and rejection within their own family, as well as the world."

Background and release

In May 2020 Tones and I explained to Poppy Reid of Rolling Stone (Australia), how she had met Kurt in 2012 and eventually they lived together, "One night at their home, [he] opened up to Tones in the way only someone who knows their heart is safe can do. He told her of his coming out journey and how it had almost broken him."

"Johnny Run Away" became her first song writing effort. Kurt reminisced, "I've had people come up to me and say they've gone through similar things and it's really helped them. I wish there was something like that ten years ago for me."

The song was uploaded onto Triple J Unearthed on 15 February 2019 and within 12 hours, received airplay on Triple J. The song was officially released for download and streaming on 1 March 2019.

Critical reception
Natalie O'Drisscol from Blank GC described the song as "a melodic slice of Nordic-inspired electro-pop that tells a very important story." Declan Byrne from Triple J said the song "is a bouncy, beautifully crafted, catchy af pop jam and Tones' striking voice will grab you straight away."

Music video
The music video was directed by Luke Dunning and released on 28 February 2019.

Charts

Weekly charts

Year-end charts

Certifications

Release history

References

2019 debut singles
2018 songs
Tones and I songs
LGBT-related songs
Song recordings produced by Konstantin Kersting
Songs written by Tones and I